Kailani Craine (born 13 August 1998) is an Australian former figure skater. She is the 2017 CS Nebelhorn Trophy champion, the 2016 CS Warsaw Cup silver medalist, the 2015 Toruń Cup silver medalist, and a six-time Australian national champion (2014–2019). She represented Australia at the 2018 and 2022 Winter Olympics, finishing 17th and 29th, respectively.

Personal life
Kailani Craine was born on 13 August 1998 in Newcastle, New South Wales, Australia. She is the daughter and only child of Katrina and Stephen Craine. She graduated from St Francis Xavier's College, Hamilton in 2016. As of 2021, she is studying law at the University of Newcastle.

Career

Early career 
Craine started skating at the age of eight. Tiffany Chin became her coach in 2010. She began appearing internationally on the junior level in 2012.

2013–2014 season 
Craine debuted on the ISU Junior Grand Prix series and won her second junior national title. In March 2014, she made her first ISU Championship appearance at the World Junior Championships in Sofia, Bulgaria; she was eliminated after placing 35th in the short program.

2014–2015 season 
In December 2014, Craine won her third junior and first senior national title at the Australian Championships. Ranked second in the short program and first in the free skate, she outscored the defending senior champion, Brooklee Han, by 2.18 points overall. Making her senior international debut, she took the silver medal at the Toruń Cup in January 2015. Craine placed twelfth at the 2015 Four Continents Championships in Seoul, South Korea, and sixteenth at the 2015 World Junior Championships in Tallinn, Estonia.

2015–2016 season 
In December 2015, Craine repeated as Australia's junior and senior national champion. She placed ninth in the free skate and thirteenth overall at the 2016 Four Continents Championships. At the 2016 World Championships, she did not qualify to the free skate.

2016–2017 season 
After taking bronze at the Volvo Open Cup, Craine stepped on her first ISU Challenger Series podium. She received the silver medal at the 2016 CS Warsaw Cup, finishing 2.54 points behind Germany's Nicole Schott. In December, she outscored Brooklee Han by 6.94 points to win her third senior national title.

In December 2016, Craine was named to Australia's team for the 2017 Asian Winter Games in Sapporo, Japan. She placed fifth at the Asian Games and sixteenth at the 2017 Four Continents Championships. In March, she qualified to the free skate at the 2017 World Championships and went on to finish twenty-fourth overall.

2017–2018 season 
Craine won bronze at the Asian Open Figure Skating Trophy in August 2017 and silver at the Slovenia Open the following month. Later in September, she competed at the 2017 CS Nebelhorn Trophy, the final qualifying opportunity for the 2018 Winter Olympics; she won the gold medal and earned a spot for Australia in the ladies singles event at the Olympics. Shortly afterwards, Craine was invited to the 2017 Skate Canada International, her debut on the Grand Prix.

After winning another Australian national title, Craine competed at the 2018 Four Continents Championships, placing sixteenth. She placed seventeenth at the 2018 Winter Olympics, and also at the 2018 World Championships.

2018–2019 season 
Craine began her season at the Autumn Classic International, where she finished fourth and won the silver medal at the Warsaw Cup. She competed on the Grand Prix at the 2018 NHK Trophy, where she placed twelfth. After winning a fifth consecutive Australian national title, she placed fifteenth at the 2019 Four Continents Championships and thirty-sixth at the 2019 World Championships.

2019–2020 season 
On the Challenger series, Craine placed fifth at the 2019 CS Autumn Classic International and fourth at the 2019 CS Asian Open. Initially without assignment on the Grand Prix, Craine was first assigned to the Cup of China to replace a withdrawn Mai Mihara. She placed twelfth at the 2020 Four Continents Championships.

Craine was assigned to compete at the World Championships in Montreal, but these were cancelled as a result of the coronavirus pandemic.

2020–2021 season 
In her only event of the season, Craine competed at the 2021 World Championships, placing twenty-sixth.

2021–2022 season 
Following not making the free skate at the World Championships, Craine sought a second opportunity to qualify a berth for Australia at the 2022 Winter Olympics by competing at the 2021 CS Nebelhorn Trophy. She placed fourth in the short program and tenth in the free skate, for seventh place overall and the sixth of six available places. Competing next at the 2021 CS Finlandia Trophy, Craine placed sixteenth before concluding the fall season by finishing eighth at the 2021 CS Golden Spin of Zagreb.

With the Australian championships cancelled for a second year, Craine was assigned to the 2022 Four Continents Championships in Tallinn to compete for her country's Olympic spot against domestic rival Victoria Alcantara. Craine finished twelfth at the event, five ordinals and twenty-five points ahead of Alcantara. Days later, she was named to the Australian Olympic team. Craine called this "the end goal" of the preceding four years, which she was proud to have achieved. She was twenty-ninth in the short program of the Olympic women's event, and did not advance to the free skate. She went on to finish the season with a twenty-second place finish at the 2022 World Championships.

Programs

Competitive highlights 
GP: Grand Prix; CS: Challenger Series; JGP: Junior Grand Prix

References

External links 
 
 

1998 births
Australian female single skaters
Living people
People from Newcastle, New South Wales
Figure skaters at the 2017 Asian Winter Games
Figure skaters at the 2018 Winter Olympics
Figure skaters at the 2022 Winter Olympics
Olympic figure skaters of Australia
Sportswomen from New South Wales